Thomas Overton Brooks (December 21, 1897 – September 16, 1961) was a Democratic U.S. representative from the Shreveport-based Fourth Congressional District of northwestern Louisiana, having served for a quarter century beginning on January 3, 1937.

Of a prominent family, Brooks was a nephew of U.S. Senator John Holmes Overton and a great-grandson of Walter Hampden Overton. At the time of his death, he was chairman of the House Science and Astronautics Committee.

Before politics
Brooks was born in Baton Rouge to Claude M. Brooks and the former Penelope Overton. He graduated from public schools. Brooks served overseas during World War I as an enlisted man in the Sixth Field Artillery, First Division, Regular Army, 1918–1919.

After the war, he obtained a degree in 1923 from Louisiana State University Law Center in Baton Rouge. He was admitted to the bar and began his practice in Shreveport in Caddo Parish in the northwestern corner of his state.

On June 1, 1932, Brooks married the former Mary Fontaine "Mollie" Meriwether (1904-1995), a daughter of Minor Meriwether (1862-1949), a planter and banker originally from Hernando, Mississippi, and the former Anne Finley McNutt (1865-1943), both of whom died in Shreveport. Overton and Mollie Brooks had one child, Laura Anne Brooks (1936-1994), who like her mother died in Houston, Texas.

Political career

1940 
Brooks faced a showdown with Henry Andrew O'Neal (1879-1970), a Shreveport insurance agent originally from Linden in Cass County, Texas. In the primary election, state Representative Wellborn Jack of Caddo Parish and J. Frank Colbert, the former mayor of Minden, were eliminated from further consideration. In the second round of balloting, Brooks received 19,375 votes (55.6 percent) to O'Neal's 15,450 (44.4 percent).

In 1947–8, he served on the Herter Committee.

1948

In 1948, Brooks defeated two intra-party rivals Harvey Locke Carey of Minden, a former short-term U.S. attorney for the United States District Court for the Western District of Louisiana, and former State Senator Lloyd Hendrick, a Natchitoches Parish native residing in Shreveport.

1950

1952 
He decried inflated home prices and large federal withholding rates from paychecks so that many could "barely buy groceries." May claimed that Brooks had given tacit support of a "Marxist" foreign policy: We cannot return sanity in foreign affairs by returning to Congress the same men who got us into this mess."

1956 
Brooks was reelected to Congress twelve times. In 1956, he signed the Southern Manifesto, a failed congressional attempt to block desegregation of public schools ordered by the United States Supreme Court in the case Brown v. Board of Education. For a time the segregationist publisher Ned Touchstone of Bossier City worked on Brooks' staff. Brooks also urged the strengthening national defense, the expanded production of natural gas, rural electrification, and "fair prices" for farm, dairy, and ranch products.

1960, the last congressional race

In 1960, during a KKK rally led by Roy Davis, a cross was burnt in the front yard of Brooks' home leading to a police investigation and the arrest of Roy Davis.

In Brooks' last election to Congress in 1960, he faced another Republican challenger, Fred Charles McClanahan, Jr. (1918–2007), a contractor from Shreveport who was reared in Homer in Claiborne Parish. McClanahan flew sixty-eight combat missions in World War II and received the Distinguished Flying Cross, the Air Medal, and the Purple Heart. His wife, Mary, an educator, was active in the League of Women Voters. George Despot, later a state Republican chairman, was his campaign manager. McClanahan called for a two-party system, which he maintained would "bring us new recognition and respect in national affairs and stabilize state government with a constant watchdog ..." McClanahan, who endorsed the Nixon-Lodge ticket, called for the United States "to lead the free world in resisting the spread of communism and winning the Cold War in this hemisphere and in every country. ... Our foreign aid program must be re-evaluated on the basis of our aims...." Like Brooks, McClanahan affirmed his support for states' rights and segregation, having proclaimed "No right of the United States government to force integration in public schools."

Brooks prevailed in his final race, 74-26 percent, though the Kennedy-Johnson ticket did not carry the Fourth Congressional District.

Committee service

Brooks served on the U.S. House Committee on Armed Services from 1947 to 1958, and he then became the first chairman of the newly formed House Space Committee (later Science and Astronautics), reportedly because his seniority entitled him to a more important post on Armed Services than he was considered capable of handling. He was reappointed in 1961. It was Brooks who proposed a civilian, rather than military, space program. On May 4, 1961, his committee sent a memo to then-Vice President Lyndon B. Johnson on this subject. U.S. President John F. Kennedy's speech which prompted the development of the Apollo program was delivered a few weeks later.

The Overton Brooks Veterans Administration Medical Center at 510 East Stoner Street in Shreveport south of Interstate 20 and viewed from along the Clyde Fant Parkway is named in his honor.

Two conservative legislative assistants to Representative Brooks, Ned Touchstone and Billy McCormack, went on to careers of their own in advocacy journalism and the Christian ministry.

1961 Rules Committee vote

Death and legacy
A few months after the roll call vote on enlargement of the House Rules Committee, Brooks died of a heart attack at Bethesda Naval Hospital in Bethesda, Maryland. 

Speaker Rayburn died exactly two months after Brooks.

Brooks was a member of the Masonic Lodge, the Shriners, the Benevolent and Protective Order of Elks, American Legion, Veterans of Foreign Wars, and the Kiwanis International.

Brooks is interred at Forest Park Cemetery East in Shreveport, the resting place of many Shreveport politicians. He was Episcopalian.

The Veterans Administration Hospital in Shreveport was renamed for Brooks in 1988.

See also
 List of United States Congress members who died in office (1950–99)

References

http://bioguide.congress.gov/scripts/biodisplay.pl?index=B000884
Ken Hechler, The Endless Space Frontier. A History of the House Committee on Science and Astronautics, 1959–1978 (Univelt, 1982)  (hardback),  (paperback)
"Overton Brooks," A Dictionary of Louisiana Biography, Vol. 1 (1988)

 

1897 births
1961 deaths
American segregationists
Louisiana State University Law Center alumni
Louisiana lawyers
United States Army personnel of World War I
United States Army soldiers
Politicians from Shreveport, Louisiana
Politicians from Baton Rouge, Louisiana
Military personnel from Louisiana
Democratic Party members of the United States House of Representatives from Louisiana
20th-century American politicians
Burials in Louisiana
20th-century American lawyers
20th-century American Episcopalians